Ribera Alta/Erriberagoitia is a municipality located in the province of Álava, in the Basque Country of northern Spain.

Localities 
The municipality is made up of 25 villages, 21 organized in turn into 20 councils, and four administered directly by the municipality.

Bolded locations denote directly-administrated villages.

Notes

External links 
 RIBERA ALTA / ERRIBERAGOITIA in the Bernardo Estornés Lasa - Auñamendi Encyclopedia 

Municipalities in Álava